Coptotriche clemensella is a moth of the family Tischeriidae. It was described by Vactor Tousey Chambers in 1878. It is found in the US states of Arkansas, Kentucky, Ohio and Texas.

The larvae feed on Quercus macrocarpa, Quercus marilandica and Quercus palustris. They mine the leaves of their host plant.

References

Moths described in 1878
Tischeriidae